Enånger is a locality situated in Hudiksvall Municipality, Gävleborg County, Sweden with 629 inhabitants in 2018.

Enånger Court District, or Enångers tingslag, was a district of Hälsingland in Sweden. The provinces in Norrland were never divided into hundreds and instead the court district (tingslag) served as the basic division of rural areas.

Sports
The following sports clubs are situated in Enånger:

 Enångers IK

References 

Populated places in Hudiksvall Municipality
Hälsingland